The ten lei banknote is one of the circulating denomination of the Romanian leu. It is the same size as the 20 Euro banknote.

The main color of the banknote is pink. It pictures, on the obverse painter Nicolae Grigorescu, and on the reverse a traditional house from Oltenia, and a detail from the Rodica painting .

The original issue was printed using the intaglio technique. On 1 December 2008, the National Bank of Romania issued a second, revised banknote. It is printed using the offset printing technique (like the one leu and five lei banknotes). The official reason was the prevention of counterfeiting. The new series shares the design with the previous series, the main difference being in the printing technique and the corresponding security features. As a result of the different printing technique, the second series appear lighter coloured than the first series.

History 
In the past, the denomination was also in the coin form, as follows:

First leu (1867-1947)
 banknote issue: 1877 (the hypothecary issue)
 coin issue: 1930
 banknote issue: 1944 (issued by the Red Army Comandament and circulated in 1944)

Second leu (1947-1952)
 no issues

Third leu - ROL (1952-2005)
 banknote issue: 1952, 1966
 coin issue: 1990 (re-issues: 1991, 1992), 1993 (re-issues: 1994, 1995)

Fourth leu - RON (since 2005)
 banknote issue: 2005 (redesigned issue of the former 100.000 lei banknote, whereas 100.000 third lei = 10 fourth lei; re-issue: 2008)

Earlier versions of the 10 lei banknote.

References 

National Bank of Romania website

Banknotes of Romania
Ten-base-unit banknotes